Gabriel Enzo Ferrari (born September 1, 1988) is an American former soccer player.

Biography
Ferrari was born in New York City to a Brazilian mother and Italian American father. He is fluent in English, Portuguese, Spanish, and Italian.

Club career

Early career
Ferrari started with Blau Weiss Gottschee where he won four New York State Championships. Ferrari played high school soccer at Saint Benedict's Preparatory School in Newark, New Jersey. He then continued his youth career in the system of Major League Soccer club MetroStars, now known as the New York Red Bulls. Gabriel was the captain of the MetroStars side that captured the U-16 North American Championship. He verbally committed to play college soccer at the University of Connecticut, but elected to sign a professional contract with Sampdoria instead.

Italy
Ferrari signed with Serie A club Sampdoria on January 17, 2007, in a deal that kept him in Italy until 2010. Gabriel made his Sampdoria debut on February 1 in a Coppa Italia match against Inter Milan, coming on as a substitute. He did not make any appearances in Serie A, the Italian top flight. In July 2008, Sampdoria announced that they loaned Ferrari out to Lega Pro Prima Divisione side Perugia. He moved on loan to Serie C side Foggia for the 2009–10 season. On February 1, 2010. he moved to Ternana Calcio.

Switzerland
In September 2010 Swiss Super League club AC Bellinzona announced they had signed Ferrari on a permanent transfer. He then went on loan with FC Wohlen in the Swiss Challenge League.

United States
Prior to the start of the 2011 Major League Soccer season Ferrari went on trial with Chicago Fire SC. After impressing during his trial stint, the club signed Ferrari on 24 March 2011. He made his Fire debut on June 18, coming on as a substitute in the 1–1 draw at the New England Revolution.

Ferrari was released by Chicago on December 7,2011.

International career
Ferrari holds American, Brazilian, and Italian citizenship.  His triple citizenship, primarily that with Italy, sparked a debate over which senior international team he might attempt to play for, as fears arose that Ferrari might play for Italy instead of his native United States, like Giuseppe Rossi. Gabriel quickly dismissed the speculation, saying:

"I'm a New Yorker. I grew up in the US and that is the country I would like to play for if I get the chance."

Ferrari scored the game-winning goal in his international debut with the US under-20 team in a 2–1 victory over the full Haitian national team on March 28 in Frisco, Texas. Ferrari was named to the 21-player squad who represented the United States at the 2007 FIFA U-20 World Cup.

In May 2008, Ferrari was named to the 22-player squad to represent the United States at the 2008 Toulon Tournament.

Honors 
Sampdoria
Coppa Italia Primavera:  2008

References

External links

1988 births
Living people
Soccer players from New York (state)
American people of Italian descent
American sportspeople of Brazilian descent
American soccer players
American expatriate soccer players
U.C. Sampdoria players
A.C. Perugia Calcio players
Chicago Fire FC players
FC Wohlen players
Calcio Foggia 1920 players
Ternana Calcio players
A.C. Carpi players
U.S. Catanzaro 1929 players
Serie B players
Serie C players
Major League Soccer players
St. Benedict's Preparatory School alumni
United States men's under-20 international soccer players
United States men's under-23 international soccer players
Association football forwards
American expatriate sportspeople in Italy
American expatriate sportspeople in Switzerland
Expatriate footballers in Italy
Expatriate footballers in Switzerland